The BT-4 Combat is a semi-automatic paintball marker manufactured by BT Paintball.

General
The BT-4 Combat series of paintball markers are the second generation of stock markers released by BT paintball. They are similar internally to the Tippmann 98 custom, and aesthetically similar to the Tippmann A-5. It is used as the base design for all other BT markers, except for the TM-7 and TM-15 - which is based on Mini Technology; with upgraded markers like the Delta Elite being BT-4's with stock add-ons.

The BT-4 Combat is a poppet valve, blow-back marker; the bolt slides forward to open the valve, and air released from the valve propels the paintball forward and recocks the bolt for another shot. The stock BT-4 Combat includes adjustable handgrip and rear sight, sliding feedneck, and 8 inch barrel.

The BT-4 Combat is designed for durability and customizability; as it is similar to the Tippmann 98 custom, it can use many of the same parts and accessories, as well as BT's line of add-ons. The marker uses the same barrel thread as the Tippmann A-5 and the stock (butt) mods of the Tippmann 98 Custom. The barrel thread is also designed to be swapped out so that barrels from other paintball markers may be used.

Additionally the BT-4 Combat marker is used nationwide as a "rental" grade marker.

References

Paintball markers